The Olympic posters are part of the greater promotion plan devised each time by the country hosting the Olympic Games for the better and easier communication of this major sporting event.  Olympic posters are closely associated with the place and time of the Games and reflect the social, cultural and sometimes the political context of the host country each time.  The Organizing Committee of the host country usually announces an artistic contest for the creation of the posters.  Then a special committee decides which entry will be the official poster of the Games.  The design process is often given strict guidelines for content, since the committee has already decided the elements it wished to include in the design and the specific messages it must convey.

Although, today the creation of a poster is deemed necessary, in the first modern Olympic Games there were no posters specially designed for the Games. The first official poster that was specially designed for the Olympic Games, following the approval of the competent committee, was the poster for the 1912 Games held in Stockholm.  The poster depicted the march of the nations represented by athletes holding their national flags. All posters are the property of the IOC.

Olympic posters

Summer Olympic poster designs

Winter Olympic poster designs

See also
 Olympic emblem
 Olympic symbols

References

External links
 Athens Info Guide - A list of past posters
 

Poster